The Bullies Have All Gone to Rest is a bluegrass and old-time music album by John Hartford and Jim Wood, released in 1998.

Reception

Writing for AllMusic, critic Brian Bailey wrote "This modest album is one of several tributes to older musical traditions that Hartford recorded late in his career. Solid if not the best, it remains worth searching out for the opportunity to hear the legend playing his banjo again."

Track listing
 "Don't You Want to Go to Heaven, Uncle Joe?" – 2:36
 "The Bullies Have All Gone to Rest" – 2:33
 "Lafayette" – 2:07
 "The Cat Came Back" – 2:43
 "Old Joe" – 2:29
 "Green Valley Waltz" – 2:09
 "Jack's Been A-Gettin' There" – 1:54
 "Old Napper" – 2:45
 "Beech Bottom" – 1:50
 "Sleepy Lou" – 1:47
 "Going Across the Sea" – 2:51
 "Lady of the Lake" – 1:50
 "Rattlesnake Bit the Baby" – :26
 "House of David Blues" – 1:53
 "Over Yonder" – 2:20
 "Green Back Dollar" – 2:28
 "New Five Cents" –  1:53
 "Possom and Taters" – 1:52

References

John Hartford albums
1998 albums